Daníel Ágúst Haraldsson (born 26 August 1969) is an Icelandic solo artist and a lead singer of the bands GusGus, Nýdönsk and Esja.

Biography

Daníel has been part of the local and international music scene since he started his career with Icelandic pop sensation Nýdönsk some 30 years ago.

In 1989, he participated in the Eurovision Song Contest 1989 for Iceland with the song "Það sem enginn sér". He finished in 22nd place, scoring no points.

After releasing 5 albums with Nýdönsk, he produced an album with electronic rock group Bubbleflies.

He then branched out into acting in the National and Municipal theatres, playing roles in West Side Story, Jesus Christ Superstar (Pontius Pilate) and Stone Free. Film directors Arni and Kinski approached him with playing a lead role in their short film Nautn. It was with this film project Daníel founded GusGus in 1995 with Kinski.

Daníel took a break from GusGus in the year 2000 to write music for both TV and documentary films and composing music for the Iceland Dance Company.

His first solo album, Swallowed a Star, was released by One Little Indian in Europe (2005) and North America (2006).

Daníel formed a musical pet project, with heavy metal band Mínus front man Krummi Björgvinsson, called Esja and released a self-titled album in 2008.

Daníel rejoined GusGus with the releases of Forever in 2007, 24/7 (2009),
Arabian Horse (2011) and Mexico (2014) touring extensively in Europe. Daníel released his second solo album, The Drift, in 2011.

References

External links 

 Official site
 Daníel@Myspace

1969 births
Living people
Eurovision Song Contest entrants of 1989
Daniel Agust Haraldsson
Daniel Agust Haraldsson
Daniel Agust Haraldsson
Daniel Agust Haraldsson